The 2000 Turkish presidential election consisted of a first round election on 27 April 2000 followed by a second round vote on 1 May and a third on 5 May. It occurred at the end of 9th president Süleyman Demirel's seven-year term in office. There was a small effort to convert Turkey's presidential system into two terms of five years each, which would have given Demirel an additional three years, but this proposal never found widespread support.

In the months leading to the vote, each of the five largest parliamentary parties informally endorsed their own candidates. However, with their no party with a defining majority, a neutral compromise candidate was sought and eventually found in the form of Ahmet Necdet Sezer, then chief justice at Turkey's Constitutional Court. Sezer was endorsed by the leaders of the governing Democratic Left, Nationalist Action and Motherland parties, as well as the leaders of the opposition Virtue and True Path parties.

A number of MPs broke from party lines to nominate themselves. Among them was parliament speaker and former prime minister Yıldırım Akbulut, who was unable to win popular support and withdrew after the second round.

Procedure

The presidential vote is held in parliament by secret ballot. A candidate requires a two-thirds majority - or 367 votes - to be elected in the first two rounds. If there is no clear winner before the third round, the winning threshold is dropped to a simple majority, or 276 votes. If there is still no winner, the two candidates with the most votes from the third round progress to a runoff election, where the simply majority rule still applies. In the event of no clear winner among the two, the Turkish constitution states that a snap general election must be called to overcome the parliamentary deadlock.

Results

|-
!style="background-color:#E9E9E9" align=left valign=top|Candidates
!style="background-color:#E9E9E9" align=left valign=top|Position or political party
!style="background-color:#E9E9E9" align=right|1st round votes
!style="background-color:#E9E9E9" align=right|2nd round votes
!style="background-color:#E9E9E9" align=right|3rd round votes
|-
|align=left|Ahmet Necdet Sezer
|align=left|Chief Justice, Constitutional Court. Cross-party candidate.
|281
|314
|330
|-
|align=left|Nevzat Yalçıntaş
|align=left|Virtue Party (Fazilet Partisi)
|61
|66
|113
|-
|align=left|Sadi Somuncuoğlu
|align=left|Nationalist Movement Party (Milliyetçi Hareket Partisi)
|58
|32
|43
|-
|align=left|Rasim Zaimoğlu
|align=left|True Path Party (Doğru Yol Partisi)
|7
|3
|24
|-
|align=left|Mehmet Mail Büyükerman
|align=left|Democratic Left Party (Demokratik Sol Parti)
|3
|2
|7
|-
|align=left|Yıldırım Akbulut
|align=left|Parliament speaker, Motherland Party (Turkey) (Anavatan Partisi)
|56
|88
| colspan=1 rowspan=2|
|-
|align=left|Doğan Güreş
|align=left|True Path Party (Doğru Yol Partisi)
|35
|22
|-
|align=left|Ahmet İyimaya
|align=left|True Path Party (Doğru Yol Partisi)
|10
| colspan=2 rowspan=3|
|-
|align=left|Agâh Oktay Güner
|align=left|Motherland Party (Turkey) (Anavatan Partisi)
|5
|-
|align=left|Oğuz Aygün
|align=left|Democratic Left Party (Demokratik Sol Parti)
|4
|-
| colspan=2 rowspan=1|Spoiled votes
|8
|2
|8
|-
| colspan=2 rowspan=1|Blank votes
|2
|3
|8
|-
| align=right colspan=2 style="background-color:#E9E9E9"|Total MP turnout
|width="75" align="right" style="background-color:#E9E9E9"|530
|width="75" align="right" style="background-color:#E9E9E9"|532
|width="75" align="right" style="background-color:#E9E9E9"|533
|-
|colspan=6 align=left|Source: Turkish Grand National Assembly online archives 
|}

Withdrawn nominations
 Vecdi Gönül, Virtue Party. Fielded his candidacy early on in the election period, withdrew when a cross-party consensus was found in Sezer. Still won five votes in the first ballot.
 Gönul Saray Alphan and Turhan İmamoğlu, both Democratic Left Party. Both withdrew their candidacies before the first ballot.

2000
2000 elections in Turkey
Indirect elections
April 2000 events in Turkey
May 2000 events in Turkey